Villanueva de la Tercia is a locality and minor local entity located in the municipality of Villamanín, in León province, Castile and León, Spain. As of 2020, it has a population of 32.

Geography 
Villanueva de la Tercia is located 51km north of León.

References

Populated places in the Province of León